Dessert salads are dishes made with jellos (jellies), whipped toppings, fruits, vegetables, mayonnaise, and various other ingredients. These salads are served at some buffet and cafeterias,  and are also served at potlucks and parties. They can be prepared ahead of time and are transportable. They include sweet ingredients, but are not always served as desserts, and are sometimes considered more generally in the salad grouping and served with the main meal rather than as a dessert. The fruit and vegetable ingredients are often canned, but fresh ingredients can also be used.

List of dessert salads

 Ambrosia
 Cookie salad
 Fruit salad
 Glorified rice
 Jello salad
 Seafoam salad
 Snickers salad
 Strawberry Delight
 Watergate salad (pistachio salad)

See also
 List of desserts
 List of salads

Salads
Desserts
Sweet salads